The 2006 National Football League Draft, the 71st in league history, took place in New York City, New York, at Radio City Music Hall on April 29 and April 30, 2006. For the 27th consecutive year, the draft was telecast on ESPN and ESPN2, with additional coverage offered by ESPNU and, for the first time, by NFL Network. Having signed a contract with the Houston Texans on the evening before the draft, Mario Williams, a defensive end from North Carolina State, became the draft's first pick. The selection surprised many commentators, who predicted that the Texans would draft Southern California running back Reggie Bush or Texas quarterback Vince Young. Ohio State produced the most first round selections (five), while Southern California produced the most overall selections (eleven). Twenty-seven compensatory and supplemental compensatory selections were distributed amongst seventeen teams; Tampa Bay, Baltimore, and Tennessee each held three compensatory picks. The league also held a supplemental draft after the regular draft and before the regular season.

The 255 players chosen in the draft were composed of:

 33 Wide receivers
 31 Linebackers
 26 Safeties
 23 Defensive tackles
 23 Cornerbacks
 22 Defensive ends
 22 Offensive tackles
 20 Offensive guards
 16 Tight ends
 14 Running backs
 13 Quarterbacks
 9 Centers
 3 Fullbacks
 2 Kickers
 2 Punters

Player selections

Supplemental draft selections
For each player selected in the Supplemental Draft, the team forfeits its pick in that round in the draft of the following season.

Notable undrafted players

Trades
In the explanations below, (PD) indicates trades completed prior to the start of the draft (i.e. Pre-Draft), while (D) denotes trades that took place during the 2006 draft.

Round one

Round two

Round three

Round four

Round five

Round six

Round seven

Miscellaneous 
 This would be the final draft that Paul Tagliabue would preside over as Commissioner of the National Football League, as he retired on September 1.
 Two individuals declared for the draft never having played college football: Jai Lewis, a power forward for the George Mason basketball team that reached the semifinals of the 2006 NCAA Division I men's basketball tournament; and Ed Nelson, a power forward for the Connecticut basketball team. Lewis signed after the draft as a free agent with the New York Giants to play offensive tackle but subsequently pursued a professional basketball career, while Nelson signed with the St. Louis Rams to be a tight end. Nelson later turned to professional basketball himself.
 Having been banned in 2004 from playing college football at Colorado for having accepted endorsements while a member of the United States Ski Team, wide receiver and kick returner Jeremy Bloom was drafted in the fifth round by the Philadelphia Eagles.
 Virginia Tech quarterback Marcus Vick, who was dismissed from the Hokies team in January 2006 for repeatedly violating team rules, was undrafted; Vick, the younger brother of former Atlanta Falcons quarterback Michael Vick, later accepted an invitation to attend a Miami Dolphins minicamp and ultimately signed a contract with the team as a wide receiver. He was then released the following season.
 Running back John David Washington, son of actor Denzel Washington, went undrafted out of the Division II school Morehouse College, where he rushed for 1,198 yards in his senior season, setting a school record; Washington was signed as a free agent by the St. Louis Rams.
 As of 2022, Marcedes Lewis, who was drafted 28th overall in the 1st round, is currently the sole active player remaining from the draft.

References & Notes

External links
 
 
 
 
 

National Football League Draft
NFL Draft
Draft
2000s in Manhattan
American football in New York City
NFL Draft
Radio City Music Hall
Sports in Manhattan
NFL Draft
Sporting events in New York City